Johnson City is a city in and the county seat of Stanton County, Kansas, United States.  As of the 2020 census, the population of the city was 1,464.

History
Johnson City was established in 1885; it was originally called Veteran because many of its founders were Civil War veterans. It was renamed Johnson City in 1886, in honor of A. S. Johnson, a railroad official.

Geography
Johnson City is located at  (37.569623, -101.752901).

Climate
According to the Köppen Climate Classification system, Johnson City has a semi-arid climate, abbreviated "BSk" on climate maps.

Area attractions
 Stanton County Museum

Demographics

2010 census
As of the census of 2010, there were 1,495 people, 533 households, and 381 families residing in the city. The racial makeup of the city was 79.3% White, 0.8% African American, 1.4% Native American, 0.2% Asian, 15.9% from other races, and 2.5% from two or more races. Hispanic or Latino of any race were 44.3% of the population.

There were 533 households, of which 40.9% had children under the age of 18 living with them, 60.4% were married couples living together, 7.5% had a female householder with no husband present, 3.6% had a male householder with no wife present, and 28.5% were non-families. 25.5% of all households were made up of individuals, and 12.4% had someone living alone who was 65 years of age or older. The average household size was 2.72 and the average family size was 3.29.

The median age in the city was 33.9 years. 29.8% of residents were under the age of 18; 8.4% were between the ages of 18 and 24; 26.8% were from 25 to 44; 21.2% were from 45 to 64; and 13.8% were 65 years of age or older. The gender makeup of the city was 50.2% male and 49.8% female.

2000 census
As of the census of 2000, there were 1,524 people, 543 households, and 388 families residing in the city. The racial makeup of the city was 81.41% White, 0.98% African American, 0.92% Native American, 0.20% Asian, 15.25% from other races, and 1.24% from two or more races. Hispanic or Latino of any race were 29.06% of the population.

There were 543 households, out of which 40.1% had children under the age of 18 living with them, 60.0% were married couples living together, 7.0% had a female householder with no husband present, and 28.5% were non-families. 24.9% of all households were made up of individuals, and 10.5% had someone living alone who was 65 years of age or older. The average household size was 2.71 and the average family size was 3.25.

In the city, the population was spread out, with 30.2% under the age of 18, 9.5% from 18 to 24, 29.3% from 25 to 44, 18.6% from 45 to 64, and 12.4% who were 65 years of age or older. The median age was 33 years. For every 100 females, there were 104.3 males. For every 100 females age 18 and over, there were 102.3 males.

The median income for a household in the city was $37,708, and the median income for a family was $43,750. Males had a median income of $29,917 versus $22,115 for females. The per capita income for the city was $16,970. About 12.1% of families and 17.8% of the population were below the poverty line, including 21.2% of those under age 18 and 16.1% of those age 65 or over.

Education
Johnson is home to USD 452 Stanton County. The Stanton County High School mascot is Stanton County Trojans.

Prior to school unification, Johnson High School also used the mascot Trojans.

In 2016, Stanton County Elementary School, located in Johnson City, was awarded the Charlotte F. Lockhart Award for Excellence in Literacy Education.

Transportation
Johnson City is bordered by two highways. U.S. Highway 160 runs east-west just north of Johnson City. State Highway 27/U.S. Highway 160 runs north-south along the west side of Johnson City. The nearest airport is Stanton County Municipal Airport. It is located 21 miles north of Richfield, about 6.5 east of Manter, 20.5 miles west of Ulysses, and 26 miles south of Syracuse.

References

Further reading

External links

 City of Johnson City
 Johnson City - Directory of Public Officials
 USD 452, local school district
 Johnson City Map, KDOT

Cities in Kansas
County seats in Kansas
Cities in Stanton County, Kansas
Populated places established in 1885
1885 establishments in Kansas